Karuneye Kutumbada Kannu is a 1962 Indian Kannada-language film, directed by T. V. Singh Takur and produced by A. C. Narasimha Murthy and Friends. The film stars Rajkumar, Udaykumar, Balakrishna and Narasimharaju. The film has musical score by G. K. Venkatesh. The film is based on the Kannada novel Dharma Devathe by Krishnamoorthy Puranik; it was the first Kannada film adaptation from a novel.

Cast

Rajkumar as Kumar
Udaykumar as Ranganna
Balakrishna as Balendra Mohana Kutike
Narasimharaju as Narasimharaju
K. S. Ashwath as K. Venkanna
Rajashankar as Chandrashekhar
Ganapathi Bhat
Vijayarao
Mahalinga Bhagavathar
Kuppuraj
Basappa
Vijaykumar
Master Udayashankar
Leelavathi
Advani Lakshmi Devi
Harini in Guest appearance
M. Jayashree
Sharadamma
Rajasree

Soundtrack
The music was composed by G. K. Venkatesh.

References

External links
 

1962 films
Films scored by G. K. Venkatesh
1960s Kannada-language films
Films based on Indian novels